Norwich North is a constituency represented in the House of Commons of the UK Parliament since 2009 by Conservative Chloe Smith.

History 
The constituency was created by the Representation of the People Act 1948 for the 1950 general election, when the former two-seat constituency of Norwich was divided into two single-member seats, Norwich North and Norwich South.

It was initially a safe seat for the Labour Party, held continuously by the party until 1983, when major boundary changes made the seat much more favourable to the Conservatives, who then held the seat from 1983 to 1997. The Labour member from 1997 to 2009 was Dr Ian Gibson, who resigned as an MP with immediate effect on 5 June 2009 after being implicated in the expenses scandal. A by-election was held to replace him on 23 July 2009, which was won by the Conservative Chloe Smith. Chloe Smith has retained the seat in the 2010, 2015, 2017 and 2019 general elections, achieving over 50% of the vote for the first time in 2019. Smith has announced her intention to stand down from Parliament at the next general election.

Boundaries and boundary changes 

1950–1951: The County Borough of Norwich wards of Catton, Coslany, Fye Bridge, Heigham, Hellesdon, Mousehold, Thorpe, and Westwick.

1951–1974: The County Borough of Norwich wards of Catton, Coslany, Fye Bridge, Heigham, Hellesdon, Mousehold, Thorpe, and Westwick, the part of the civil parish of Thorpe-next-Norwich in the Rural District of Blofield and Flegg, and the part of the parish of Sprowston in the Rural District of St Faiths and Aylsham added to the County Borough of Norwich by the Norwich Extension Act 1950.

Boundaries expanded under the provisions of Statutory Instrument 1951–325.

1974–1983: The County Borough of Norwich wards of Catton, Coslany, Crome, Heigham, Hellesdon, Mancroft, Mousehold, and Thorpe.

Further to the Second Periodic Review of Parliamentary Constituencies a redistribution of seats was enacted in 1970. However, in the case of the two Norwich constituencies, this was superseded before the February 1974 general election by the Parliamentary Constituencies (Norwich) Order 1973 which followed on from a revision of the County Borough of Norwich wards in 1971, resulting in a realignment of the boundary with Norwich South.

1983–1997: The District of Broadland wards of Catton, Hellesdon North, Hellesdon South East, Hellesdon West, Sprowston Central, Sprowston East, Sprowston South, Sprowston West, Thorpe St Andrew North East, Thorpe St Andrew North West, and Thorpe St Andrew South, and the City of Norwich wards of Catton Grove, Coslany, Crome, Mile Cross, and Mousehold.

Gained suburban areas now part of the District of Broadland, including Thorpe St Andrew from Yarmouth and Hellesdon and Sprowston from North Norfolk.  Southern parts transferred to Norwich South.

1997–2010: The District of Broadland wards of Catton, Drayton, Hellesdon North, Hellesdon South East, Hellesdon West, Sprowston Central, Sprowston East, Sprowston South, Sprowston West, Taverham, Thorpe St Andrew North East, Thorpe St Andrew North West, and Thorpe St Andrew South, and the City of Norwich wards of Catton Grove, Coslany, Crome, Mile Cross, and Mousehold.

District of Broadland wards of Drayton and Taverham transferred from Mid Norfolk.

2010–present: The District of Broadland wards of Hellesdon North West, Hellesdon South East, Old Catton and Sprowston West, Sprowston Central, Sprowston East, Thorpe St Andrew North West, and Thorpe St Andrew South East, and the City of Norwich wards of Catton Grove, Crome, Mile Cross, and Sewell.

The constituency includes parts of two local government areas, Norwich and Broadland with the majority of the electorate in Broadland.

Following their review of parliamentary constituencies in Norfolk that concluded in 2004 and came into effect for the 2010 general election, the Boundary Commission for England created a slightly modified Norwich North constituency. The part of the Crome ward around Morse Road moved to Norwich North, while the area around Mousehold Street in Thorpe Hamlet became part of Norwich South. Drayton and Taverham transferred back out, to the new county constituency of Broadland.

The changes were necessary to re-align the constituency boundaries with the new local government ward boundaries introduced in Broadland and Norwich and to take account of Norfolk being awarded an additional, ninth constituency by the Boundary Commission.

Members of Parliament

Elections

Elections in the 2010s

Elections in the 2000s

Elections in the 1990s

Elections in the 1980s

Note: This constituency underwent boundary changes after the 1979 election, so was notionally a Conservative-held seat.

Elections in the 1970s

Elections in the 1960s

Elections in the 1950s

See also 
 2009 Norwich North by-election
 List of parliamentary constituencies in Norfolk

Notes

References

Constituencies of the Parliament of the United Kingdom established in 1950
Parliamentary constituencies in Norfolk
Politics of Norwich